Kunzar, or Kunzer, is a town in the union territory of Jammu and Kashmir located in the District Baramulla. It is 30 km from Srinagar and approximately 32 km from Baramulla town.

Geography
It has an average elevation of 1,761 metres (5,778 feet). Kunzer is situated on the left bank/side of river Ferozpora Nallah which is the big river of this area. Kunzer is also famous for clean water as there are few springs in kunzer town and people of the surrounding areas come here and collect water for drinking purposes as the water comes from these springs is very sweet and the people call these springs as Kokar nag.

Demographics
 India census, Kunzer had a population of 1901. Males constitute 47% of the population and females 53%. Kunzer has an average literacy rate of 46%, lower than the national average of 59.5%: male literacy is 62%, and female literacy is 30%. In Kunzer, 13% of the population is under 6 years of age.Kunzer has a Primary Health Center PHC for all the patients of the area.It has one Govt. Higher Secondary school, Govt High school, Mohammadia High School, Hamdania Public school, Allama Iqbal high school and various government middle and primary schools.
A Jammu and Kashmir Bank  ATM and an HDFC ATM are functional in the market. A J and K Bank branch is also present. A post office is also located in the town. Tehsil Office is located opposite the Army Camp. For recreational purposes, two public parks have been developed, which are located near the Kunzer bridge.
Kunzer is also a gateway to famous tourist hill station Gulmarg and Baba Reshi.There is a very large market at Kunzer

References

Cities and towns in Baramulla district